The 1972 NCAA Men's University Division Ice Hockey Tournament was the culmination of the 1971–72 NCAA University Division men's ice hockey season, the 25th such tournament in NCAA history. It was held between March 16 and 18, 1972, and concluded with Boston University defeating Cornell 4-0. All games were played at the Boston Garden in Boston, Massachusetts.

Qualifying teams
Four teams qualified for the tournament, two each from the eastern and western regions. The ECAC tournament champion and the two WCHA tournament co-champions received automatic bids into the tournament. An at-large bid was offered to a second eastern team based upon both their ECAC tournament finish as well as their regular season record.

Format
The ECAC champion was seeded as the top eastern team while the WCHA co-champion with the better regular season record was given the top western seed. The second eastern seed was slotted to play the top western seed and vice versa. All games were played at the Boston Garden. All matches were Single-game eliminations with the semifinal winners advancing to the national championship game and the losers playing in a consolation game.

Tournament bracket

Note: * denotes overtime period(s)

Semifinals

(E1) Boston University vs. (W2) Wisconsin

(W1) Denver vs. (E2) Cornell

Consolation Game

(W1) Denver vs. (W2) Wisconsin

National Championship

(E1) Boston University vs. (E2) Cornell

All-Tournament team
G: Tim Regan* (Boston University)
D: Bob Brown (Boston University)
D: Ric Jordan (Boston University)
F: John Danby (Boston University)
F: Dave Westner (Cornell)
F: Gary Winchester (Wisconsin)
* Most Outstanding Player(s)

References

Tournament
NCAA Division I men's ice hockey tournament
NCAA University Division Men's Ice Hockey Tournament
NCAA University Division Men's Ice Hockey Tournament
NCAA University Division Men's Ice Hockey Tournament
Ice hockey competitions in Boston